Shahar Tibi (born 26 October 1997) is an Israeli sailor.

Career
Tibi is representing Israel in the 2020 Summer Olympics alongside Noya Bar Am, competing in the Women’s Two Person Dinghy events.

References

External links
 
 
 
 

1997 births
Living people
Israeli female sailors (sport)
Olympic sailors of Israel
Sailors at the 2020 Summer Olympics – 470